Triplophysa xiqiensis is a species of stone loach endemic to China.

References

xiqiensis
Endemic fauna of China
Freshwater fish of China
Taxa named by Ding Rui-Hua
Fish described in 1996